The Danubitoidea is a large and diverse superfamily in the order Ceratitida of the Ammonoidea that combines five families removed from the Ceratitaceae, Clydonitaceae, and Ptychitaceae.

Taxonomy
Superfamily Danubitoidea
 Family Aplococeratidae
 Family Danubitidae
 Family Lecanitidae
 Family Longobarditidae
 Family Nannitidae

The largest family in the Danubitoidea is the Longobarditidae with 11 genera distributed among three subfamilies plus three of undetermined placement. Smallest families are the Lecanitidae and Nannitidae, each represented by a single genus.

Distribution and range
Fossils of the Danubitoidea have been found in the Triassic of Afghanistan, Russia, China, Papua New Guinea; Italy, Switzerland, Hungary; British Columbia, Yukon, Nunavut; Idaho, Nevada, and California.

References
Classification of E. T. Tozer 1981  
E. T. Tozer. 1981. Triassic Ammonoidea: Classification, evolution and relationship with Permian and Jurassic Forms. The Ammonoidea: The evolution classification, mode of life and geological usefulness of a major fossil group 66-100 
Classification of E. T. Tozer 1994 
E. T. Tozer. 1994. Canadian Triassic Ammonoid Faunas. Geological Survey of Canada Bulletin 467:1-663
Treatise on Invertebrate Paleontology, Part L, Ammonoidea. R. C. Moore (ed) Geol Soc of America and Univ of Kansas press, 1957.

 
Ceratitida superfamilies
Triassic first appearances
Triassic extinctions